Okinawa 1st district is a constituency of the House of Representatives in the Diet of Japan (national legislature). It is located in Okinawa Prefecture and encompasses the city of Naha and parts of Shimajiri District (Kumejima, Tokashiki, Zamami, Aguni, Tonaki, Minamidaitō, Kitadaitō). As of 2016, 270,872 eligible voters were registered in the district.

The district has been represented by Seiken Akamine of the Japanese Communist Party (JCP) since the 2014 general election, when he defeated the incumbent member Kōnosuke Kokuba from the Liberal Democratic Party. Akamine is the only JCP politician in the country to currently hold a single-seat constituency.

Background 
The 1994 electoral reforms split Okinawa's at-large constituency into four single-district constituencies. In the first three elections after the reforms, Okinawa's 1st district was won by Tai'ichi Shiraho of New Frontier Party and later New Kōmeitō (NKP). The district also features several significant voting blocs. The reliable and sizable Soka Gakkai voting bloc in Naha helped to deliver the district to Shiraho in those elections. The Japanese Communist Party (JCP) has also maintained a relatively large share of vote in the district, banking on the urban voter support and local opposition to the US military bases in Okinawa. Another bloc consists of corporate workers that tend to support the LDP.

In the 2014 general election, the district was won by JCP's Seiken Akamine. Akamine's election was a watershed as it marked the first time a JCP candidate managed to win a single-seat constituency since the 1996 general election. This is also only the third constituency JCP has won since the introduction of parallel voting. The anti-base camp aligned to Okinawa Governor Takeshi Onaga created an alliance behind Akamine to oppose the LDP incumbent at that time, Kōnosuke Kokuba. Kokuba supports the relocation of the US air base in Futenma to Henoko, following the policy of the LDP and Prime Minister Shinzo Abe. The centre-right vote was split further with the candidacy of former representative Mikio Shimoji. A strong anti-base vote and the split in the centre-right camp delivered the district to Akamine, completing JCP's surge in the election.

Akamine retained the district in the 2017 general election despite the JCP losing seats across the country. Akamine managed to keep the anti-base camp solidly behind him, giving him a slightly larger majority than 2014.

List of representatives

Election results

References 

Districts of the House of Representatives (Japan)